Irwin is a borough in Westmoreland County, Pennsylvania,  southeast of Pittsburgh. Some of the most extensive bituminous coal deposits in the commonwealth are located here. In the past, iron foundries, flour mills, car shops, facing and planing mills, electricals goods, and mirror factories provided employment to the residents. In 1900, the population numbered 2,452; it increased to 2,886 in 1910. The population was 3,973 at the 2010 census.

History
Irwin was named for John Irwin, the original owner of the town site.

Irwin was the original western terminus of the Pennsylvania Turnpike when it opened in October 1940.

Brush Hill was listed on the National Register of Historic Places in 1975.

Geography

Demographics

As of the census of 2000, there were 4,366 people, 2,084 households, and 1,131 families residing in the borough. The population density was 4,947.0 people per square mile (1,915.6/km2). There were 2,277 housing units at an average density of 2,580.0 per square mile (999.0/km2). The racial makeup of the borough was 96.61% White, 1.01% African American, 0.09% Native American, 1.19% Asian, 0.02% Pacific Islander, 0.37% from other races, and 0.71% from two or more races. Hispanic or Latino of any race were 0.66% of the population.

There were 2,084 households, out of which 25.1% had children under the age of 18 living with them, 38.8% were married couples living together, 12.0% had a female householder with no husband present, and 45.7% were non-families. 39.5% of all households were made up of individuals, and 15.1% had someone living alone who was 65 years of age or older. The average household size was 2.09 and the average family size was 2.83.

In the borough the population was spread out, with 20.9% under the age of 18, 8.9% from 18 to 24, 32.7% from 25 to 44, 21.2% from 45 to 64, and 16.4% who were 65 years of age or older. The median age was 37 years. For every 100 females, there were 87.9 males. For every 100 females age 18 and over, there were 85.1 males.

The median income for a household in the borough was $32,758, and the median income for a family was $41,947. Males had a median income of $31,901 versus $23,519 for females. The per capita income for the borough was $18,722. About 6.6% of families and 8.8% of the population were below the poverty line, including 8.4% of those under age 18 and 5.6% of those age 65 or over.

Local landmarks
Brush Creek Cemetery is located outside of Irwin. It is a non-profit, non-sectarian cemetery.

Notable people
 Doug Plank — former safety for The Ohio State University and National Football League’s Chicago Bears; held various coaching positions in the National Football League and Arena Football League following his playing career
 Mark Critz — former U.S. Representative for Pennsylvania's 12th congressional district
 Paul Doucette — drummer, rhythm guitarist, and backing vocalist for Matchbox Twenty; lead vocalist of The Break and Repair Method
 J. J. Matijevic — first baseman for the Texas League’s Corpus Christi Hooks and the Houston Astros; played for the University of Arizona

References

Boroughs in Westmoreland County, Pennsylvania
Populated places established in 1853
Pittsburgh metropolitan area
1864 establishments in Pennsylvania